Susanne Raab (née Knasmüller; born 20 October 1984) is an Austrian politician of the Austrian People's Party (ÖVP) who has been serving as Minister for Integration (since 2020) and as Minister for Women, Family and Youth (since 2021) in the government of Chancellor Sebastian Kurz.

References

External links 
 Susanne Raab on the Austrian Parliament website

1984 births
Living people
Government ministers of Austria
Women government ministers of Austria
Austrian People's Party politicians
21st-century Austrian women politicians
21st-century Austrian politicians